Steps Ahead is the second album by the American jazz group Steps Ahead, released on Elektra/Musician in 1983. The group had previously released three albums under the name Steps on Nippon Columbia (Smokin' in the Pit (1981), Step by Step (1981) and Paradox (1982)), with  Don Grolnick on piano and Steve Gadd on drums on "Smokin' in the Pit" and "Step by Step".

Reception
Allmusic awarded the album with 4.5 stars and its review by Scott Yanow states: "The music is essentially high-quality funky fusion, with Brecker typically blowing up a storm, Mainieri often playing the synthivibe, and Elias showing some early individuality".

Track listing
 "Pools" (Don Grolnick) – 11:16
 "Islands" (Mike Mainieri) – 6:25
 "Loxodrome" (Eddie Gómez) – 5:26
 "Both Sides of the Coin" (Brecker, Mainieri) – 6:10
 "Skyward Bound" (Mainieri) – 4:04
 "Northern Cross" (Peter Erskine) – 5:49
 "Trio (An Improvisation)" (Brecker, Gómez, Mainieri) – 7:32

Personnel
Steps Ahead
 Michael Brecker – tenor saxophone
 Mike Mainieri – vibraphone, synthesizer vibes, marimba, synthesizer, percussion 
 Eliane Elias – piano 
 Eddie Gómez – bass  
 Peter Erskine – drums

References

1983 albums
Steps Ahead albums
Elektra/Musician albums